Mohammad Idris is a Bangladesh Awami League politician and the former Member of Parliament of Chittagong-12.

Career
Idris was elected to parliament from Chittagong-12 as a Bangladesh Awami League candidate in 1973.

References

Awami League politicians
Living people
1st Jatiya Sangsad members
Year of birth missing (living people)
People from Chittagong District